130 Air Defence Regiment is part of the Corps of Army Air Defence of the Indian Army.

Formation 
130 Air Defence Regiment was raised on 28 January 1967 as a provisional Territorial Army unit in Assam. It was regularised as a regular air defence regiment of the Indian Artillery after the 1971 war.

Operations 
The regiment has taken part in the following operations -
Indo-Pakistani War of 1971 The unit was assigned to protect vital installations in the Eastern, Western and Northern sectors, which it carried out with distinction.
Operation Trident The regiment was deployed in the desert sector in 1987 during this operation.
Operation Vijay The unit was the only Air Defence Regiment to be deployed during the action on the icy heights of Kargil. It was under the command of Colonel Ajit Palekar. Personnel from the unit were awarded one Sena Medal (Lieutenant Pradipta Dutta) and four GOC-in-C Commendation Cards for exceptional bravery during the war.
Operation Parakram
Operation Rakshak Counter-insurgency operations
 Aid to civil authorities During relief operations in Haryana, Gujarat and Punjab.

Other achievements
 It was the first ever air defence regiment to send an overseas training contingent to Sri Lanka in 2007. 
 The regiment conducted the Army Air Defence enclosure during Shauryanjali, the 2015 Indian Army exhibition to commemorate the Golden Jubilee of the Indo-Pakistani War of 1965.
 The Regiment was awarded Director General Army Air Defence Unit Appreciation award twice for exceptional performance in all spheres – first in 2005 and then in 2015.

War Cry
The war cry of the regiment is दुर्गा माता की जय (Durga Māta Ki Jai), which translates to Victory to the Mother Goddess Durga. The war cry stands for the courage and resolute fighting spirit of the unit.

Honours and awards
Personnel from the unit have been awarded the following –
 Vishisht Seva Medal – 1
 Sena Medal – 2
 COAS Commendation Cards – 5
 GOC-in-C Commendation Cards – 31

References

Military units and formations established in 1967
Air defence regiments of the Indian Army